Carex brachystachys is a species of sedge found in the mountains of central and southern Europe.

References

External links 
 Carex brachystachys - SEINet Portal Network
 Carex brachystachys Schrank - Encyclopedia of Life
 Taxonomy browser (Carex brachystachys) - NCBI

brachystachys
Flora of Austria
Flora of Czechoslovakia
Flora of France
Flora of Germany
Flora of Italy
Flora of Poland
Flora of Romania
Flora of Spain
Flora of Switzerland
Flora of Bosnia and Herzegovina
Flora of Croatia
Flora of Kosovo
Flora of Montenegro
Flora of North Macedonia
Flora of Serbia
Flora of Slovenia